Kyunde (Kıadaŋda) is a rural locality (a selo), one of two settlements, in addition to Sydybyl, the administrative centre of the Rural Okrug, in Chochunsky Rural Okrug of Vilyuysky District in the Sakha Republic, Russia. Its population as of the 2010 Census was 196, of whom 100 were male and 96 female, down from 229 as recorded during the 2002 Census.

References

Notes

Sources
Official website of the Sakha Republic. Registry of the Administrative-Territorial Divisions of the Sakha Republic. Vilyuysky District. 

Rural localities in Vilyuysky District